Kim Jee-woon (born July 6, 1964) is a South Korean film director, screenwriter and producer. He is known for his films The Foul King (2000), A Tale of Two Sisters (2003), A Bittersweet Life (2005),
I Saw the Devil (2010), and The Good, the Bad, the Weird (2008).

Career 
Kim started out directing theater but has worked with increasing levels of success in cinema, showing accomplished acting and a detailed stylization in his films. Kim also pays careful attention to the release of his films on DVD and goes to greater than usual lengths to package them with extensive documentary materials and revealing commentary tracks.

Kim is growing substantially both as a director and a visual stylist as demonstrated by two of his most recent films A Tale of Two Sisters and A Bittersweet Life both of which were received as critical and commercial successes.

In 2010 Kim directed the thriller I Saw the Devil, the cast of which includes Choi Min-sik (which he worked with previously on his film The Quiet Family) and Lee Byung-hun (whom he worked with previously on The Good, the Bad, the Weird and A Bittersweet Life).

Kim's next film was his US debut, featuring the return of Arnold Schwarzenegger to lead acting roles, The Last Stand, for Lionsgate Films. The film also starred Johnny Knoxville, Forest Whitaker, Peter Stormare, and Daniel Henney.

After his US debut, Kim returned to Korea to produce "Illang: The Wolf Brigade" based upon Mamoru Oshii's anime "Jin-Roh: The Wolf Brigade".

The Quiet Family
In 1998, Kim directed and wrote his first feature film, The Quiet Family (1998), a horror/drama/comedy about a family who owns a mountain inn whose guests continue to commit suicide. The film was his first collaboration with actors Choi Min-sik (whom he would later collaborate with in I Saw the Devil) and Song Kang-ho (whom he would later collaborate with in The Foul King and The Good, the Bad, the Weird). The film won Best Live Action film at the 1999 Fantasporto festival, and Best Director and Best Film at the Malaga International Week of Fantastic Cinema. It was also nominated for Best Film at the 1998 Sitges - Catalan International Film Festival.

The Foul King
In 2000, Kim directed and wrote his second feature film, The Foul King (2000), re-uniting again with Song Kang-ho. The film follows an unproductive and incompetent bank clerk (played by Song Kang-ho) who escapes his demanding, alpha-male boss by entering the pro-wrestling ring and fighting under a pseudonym, "The Foul King." The two worlds eventually end up colliding, however. The film won Best Director at the 2001 Milan International Film Festival, and an Audience Award at the Udine Far East Film Festival.

Coming Out (short film)
In 2001, Kim directed and wrote a short film entitled Coming Out (2001). The film is about vampires, among other things, and Kim wrote and directed Coming Out as part of a project to distribute three digital short films online. It was also commissioned by venture group Media 4M, and the project also included shorts by Jang Jin and Ryu Seung-wan. Coming Out was shot with a Canon XL-1 camcorder during a time when digital filmmaking in South Korea was still in its infancy, and went on to inspire many other digital productions. It was shown at the Fantasia Festival, and the Puchon International Fantastic Film Festival in 2001 and the Thessaloniki International Film Festival in 2005. Coming Out was also included as a special feature on the UK DVD release of The Quiet Family and a review at DVDActive praised it as "delicate, cerebral and contemporary cinema at its most profound."

Memories segment in Three
Kim next wrote and directed the "Memories" segment in the omnibus film, Three (also known as Three Extremes II), also featuring segments directed by Peter Chan and Nonzee Nimibutr. The segment starred Kim Hye-soo.

A Tale of Two Sisters
In 2003, Kim wrote and directed A Tale of Two Sisters (2003), which won a number of awards at a number of film festivals including the Fant-Asia Film Festival (most popular film), Best Actress (Su-jeong Lim), Best Director and Best Film at the Fantasporto, Best Picture at Screamfest Horror Film Festival, Grand Prize and the Youth Jury Grand Prize at the Gerardmer Film Festival, and acting awards for Su-jeong Lim and Jung-ah Yum at the Blue Dragon Film Awards and the Brussels International Fantastic Film Festival. The film was later remade into the 2009 U.S. film The Uninvited, starring Emily Browning, with Kim being credited with an original story/writer credit.

A Bittersweet Life
In 2005, Kim wrote and directed A Bittersweet Life (2005), his first collaboration with actor Lee Byung-hun (whom he would later work with in The Good, the Bad, the Weird and I Saw the Devil). The film was an ultra-stylish and ultra-violent gangster and mobster picture that was both a critical and commercial success in South Korea. Lee Byung-hun won Best Actor at the Baeksang Arts Awards and Hwang Jung-min won a Best Supporting Actor award at Korea's Grand Bell Awards. Kim also won the "Action Asia Award" at the 2006 Deauville Asian Film Festival.

The Good, The Bad, The Weird
In 2008, Kim wrote and directed The Good, the Bad, the Weird (2008), his tribute to spaghetti westerns, westerns and western action films. He would re-team again with Song Kang-ho (who played "The Weird") as well as Lee Byung-hun (who played "The Bad") in the film. The film takes place in 1930s Manchuria and chronicles the struggles of the three main characters in trying to find a piece of treasure. The film won an Achievement in Cinematography Award from the 2008 Asia Pacific Screen Awards, won Best Supporting Actor for Jung Woo-sung (the "Good") at the 2009 Asian Film Awards, and won Best Director and Best Special Effects at the 2008 Sitges - Catalan International Film Festival.

I Saw The Devil
In 2010, Kim directed, based on a screenplay from Park Hoon-jung, I Saw the Devil (2010), re-uniting with actors Choi Min-sik and Lee Byung-hun. The film won a number of awards, including Best Director and Best Film at Fantasporto, Special Jury Prize, Audience Award, Critics Award at the Gerardmer Film Festival, Best Lighting at the Grand Bell Awards, Best Foreign Language film from the Austin Film Critics Association and Best Editing from the 2011 Asian Film Awards.

Doomsday Book
In 2012, Kim directed and wrote the segment known as "The Heavenly Creature" about a robot who achieves enlightenment in a Buddhist temple, in 2012 omnibus film Doomsday Book (Yim Pil-sung directed the other two segments). The film won Best International Film at the Fantasia Festival and a Special Award at the Toronto After Dark Film Festival.

The Last Stand
In 2013, Kim made his U.S. feature directorial debut with the action film, The Last Stand, starring Arnold Schwarzenegger, Johnny Knoxville, Forest Whitaker, Daniel Henney, and more.

The X
In 2013, Kim premiered his short, The X, in the Gala Presentation category at the Busan International Film Festival.

The Age of Shadows
On August 3, 2015, it was announced that Warner Bros. would finance and distribute its first ever Korean-language 1930s set drama Secret Agent, and the $8.62 million budgeted film would also be produced by Grimm Pictures. The project and script was developed by Lee Jin-sook, which Kim Jee-woon would direct and the cast would be Song Kang-ho and Gong Yoo. A trailer was released on July 14, 2016, revealing the new title as The Age of Shadows.

Illang: The Wolf Brigade
From 2017 to 2018, Kim filmed the science fiction action film Illang: The Wolf Brigade, a remake of the 1999 anime film Jin-Roh: The Wolf Brigade 

Dr. Brain (Apple TV+ original)
In May 2019, YG Entertainment's drama production subsidiary YG STUDIOPLEX announced that Kim will direct the company's adaptation of the Daum  webtoon Dr. Brain, created by Mister Hong.

In October 2020, several Korean news outlets reported that the adaptation was picked up by Apple TV+, becoming the latter's first Korean language original series.이선균, 애플TV플러스 '미스터 로빈' 출연할까 "제안받은 상태" Titled Dr. Brain, it will have six episodes aimed for broadcast in 2021. 

Future projects
In October 2013, it was announced that Kim is set to direct the movie adaptation of Ed Brubaker's pulp crime comic Coward''.

Filmography

Feature films

Short films

Web series

Recurring cast

Award and nomination

References

External links
 
 Kim Jee-woon Biography – Film – Time Out London
 Kim Jee-woon interview – Future Movies

South Korean film directors
South Korean screenwriters
1964 births
Living people
People from Seoul
Horror film directors
International Writing Program alumni
Best Director Paeksang Arts Award (film) winners